Thesprotia insolita, the Costa Rican grass mantis, is a species of mantis found in Costa Rica.

References

insolita
Mantodea of North America
Insects of Central America
Insects described in 1935